Paulo Alexandre Raimundo (born 1976) is a Portuguese politician who has served as General Secretary of the Portuguese Communist Party since the party's National Conference in November 2022.

References 

Portuguese Communist Party politicians
21st-century Portuguese politicians
1976 births
Living people